Jack Cawthra (15 August 1904 – 1974) was an English footballer who played as a goalkeeper for Rochdale. He also played in the reserves teams for Halifax Town and Burnley

References

1904 births
1974 deaths
Rochdale A.F.C. players
Halifax Town A.F.C. players
Burnley F.C. players
Leyland Motors F.C. players
Footballers from Halifax, West Yorkshire
English footballers
Association footballers not categorized by position